The  is a limited express train service in Japan operated by Shikoku Railway Company (JR Shikoku), which runs between  and  via . The train is named after Mount Tsurugi, the second-highest mountain in Shikoku.

Route
The stations served by this service are as follows:

 -  - -  - -  -  -  -  - 

Stations in brackets are stations where not all trains stop at.

 Down Tsurugisan no. 5, up no. 6 and up no. 10 services do not stop at Ishii.
 Tsurugisan no. 10 does not stop at Awa-Kawashima.

Rolling stock
Services are formed of 2-car KiHa 185 series diesel multiple unit (DMU) trains, based at Takamatsu Depot. Some trains are lengthened to three cars at busy periods.

History
Tsurugisan services were introduced from the start of the 16 March 1996 timetable revision, operating between Tokushima and Kochi, and replacing some of the earlier  express services.

See also
 Tsurugi (train), another train service

References

External links

 JR Shikoku train information 

Named passenger trains of Japan
Railway services introduced in 1996
Shikoku Railway Company